Raorchestes ravii is a species of frogs of the genus Raorchestes found in Naduvattam in the district of Nilgiris in Tamil Nadu, India. The species is named after Ravi Chandran, an enthusiast from Wayanad who discovered the species.

References

External links

ravii
Endemic fauna of the Western Ghats
Frogs of India
Amphibians described in 2011